Josi W. Konskiis a film producer. Josi is a longtime member of the Directors Guild of America, has either produced, managed or directed over 60 feature films.   His experience ranges from studio pictures to independents.

Producer credits
1980 Super Fuzz (producer)
1981 Freddie of the Jungle (producer)
1981 A Friend is a Treasure (producer)
1982 Banana Joe (producer)
1983 Cat and Dog (producer)
1983 Go for It (producer)
1984 Pulsebeat (producer)
1985 Trinity: Good Guys and Bad Guys (line producer, producer)
1987 Russkies (line producer - uncredited)
1988 Bersaglio sull'autostrada (producer)
1988 Trading Hearts (producer)
1988 Primal Rage (producer - as Josi Konski)
1989 Summer Job (line producer, producer)
1989 Nightmare Beach (producer)
1989 Cat Chaser (executive producer - as Josi Konski)
1990 Unlawful Passage (producer)
1995 Magic Island (video) (line producer)
1997 Big City Blues (line producer, producer)
1999 Friends & Lovers (producer)
2006 Cattle Call (producer)
2011 Naked in America (documentary) (producer)
2011 Funky Koval (producer)
2023 Sweetwater (producer)

References

External links

Year of birth missing (living people)
Living people
Cuban emigrants to the United States
People from Havana
People from Tampa, Florida
Embry–Riddle Aeronautical University alumni
United States Air Force officers
Cuban film producers